Livingston Manor Central School is a school district in Livingston Manor, New York, United States. The superintendent is Mr. John Evans.

History

The school was built in 1938. It is located on the peninsula of Sherwood Island.

Athletics

Livingston Manor competes in Section IX Class "D" for all sports. They were 2010 and 2011 Class "D" State Champion in Softball and 2011 State Champion for Baseball. Livingston Manor holds at least 1 Section title in every sport program they have. Former Softball Standout, Marissa Diescher, was inducted into the New York State High School Softball Hall of Fame as part of the Induction Class of 2022.

External links
 Official site

School districts in New York (state)
Education in Sullivan County, New York
School districts established in 1938